BTB/POZ domain-containing protein TNFAIP1 is a protein that in humans is encoded by the TNFAIP1 gene.

This gene was identified as a gene whose expression can be induced by the tumor necrosis factor alpha (TNF) in umbilical vein endothelial cells. Studies of a similar gene in mouse suggest that the expression of this gene is developmentally regulated in a tissue-specific manner.

References

Further reading